Mersa is a monotypic moth genus of the family Tortricidae. Its only species, Mersa metochia, is found on Seram Island in Indonesia. Both the genus and species were first described by Józef Razowski in 2013. The habitat consists of lower montane forests at altitudes of about 1,470 meters.

The wingspan is about 16 mm. The ground colour of the forewings is whitish faintly mixed with brownish. The markings are brown. The hindwings are brownish white.

Etymology
The genus name is an anagram of the name of the island of Seram. The specific name refers to the colouration of the species and is derived from Greek metochia (meaning a share).

References

Moths described in 2013
Archipini